The ancient town of La Hoya (Biasteri, Alava, Basque Country) is an important archaeological site of the Bronze and Iron Ages of the Basque Country and nearby areas of Spain.

The fortified town was inhabited between the 15th and 3rd centuries BCE and occupies four hectares. It has three levels:

 Middle-Late Bronze Age: in this early period, the fortifications, as well the houses, were all made of wood.
 Early-Middle Iron Age: construction became more complex using mixed formulas with stone, wood and adobe. Most houses were near the wall in this period.
 The Late Iron Age, with a cultural context that some classify as Celtiberian, shows important changes in urbanization: with paved streets and plazas that form a reticular structure. The wall is also rebuilt on stone. This final period also shows great advancement in the technologies: potter's wheel, elaborated blacksmithing, etc.

The successive layers of rubble, that served as cementations for further edification, make up a small tell 3 meters high.

The town was destroyed violently c. 300 BCE, leaving the remains of the people and their quotidian tools in the streets.

References

External links
Euskonews: La Hoya (Laguardia, Alava): Un poblado fortificado del primer milenio a.c.. Article by Armando Llanos.
Auñamendi Encyclopedia: La Hoya
Iregua: Poblado de La Hoya

Basque history
Prehistoric Europe
Bien de Interés Cultural landmarks in Álava